European Seaways Inc. is a Greek shipping company that operates ferry services between Italy, Greece, and formerly Albania.

Routes
European Seaways operates the following route across the Adriatic Sea:

Brindisi - Vlore

Fleet
European Seaways currently operates the following RORO ferry:

Current Fleet

Former ships

References

Ferry companies of Greece
Companies based in Athens
Ferry companies of Italy